Marta Vincenzi (born 27 May 1947) is an Italian politician and former Mayor of Genoa. She was previously a Member of the European Parliament for the North-West of Italy with the Democrats of the Left (DS), part of the Socialist Group from 2004 until she resigned on 29 June 2007.

Vincenzi was born in Genoa. She sat on the European Parliament's Committee on Transport and Tourism, and was a substitute for the Committee on Regional Development and the Committee on Women's Rights and Gender Equality. She was also a member of the Delegation for relations with the Mashreq countries. She served as President of the Province of Genoa from 1993 to 2002. In May 2007 Marta Vincenzi became mayor of Genoa with the Democratic Party. In February 2012 she ran in a primary election to seek a second term as mayor, but lost to independent candidate Marco Doria.

Career
 Graduate in philosophy
 Director of studies at an institute of higher education
 Member of the provincial and regional executives of the Italian Communist Party, the Democratic Party of the Left, and the DS
 Member of the DS national executive
 1990: Member of the Municipal Council of Genoa with responsibility for educational institutions, IT, decentralisation and personnel
 1993–2002: President of the Province of Genoa
 since 2002: Municipal councillor and training adviser delegated by the Provincial Council for the metropolitan area
 2003: Vice-chairman of the company Sistema logistico dell'Arco ligure alessandrino s.r.l.
 2004: Member of the board of directors of the International Institute of Communications of Genoa

See also
2004 European Parliament election in Italy

References

External links
 
 

1947 births
Living people
Italian Communist Party politicians
20th-century Italian politicians
Mayors of Genoa
Women mayors of places in Italy
MEPs for Italy 2004–2009
21st-century women MEPs for Italy
Democrats of the Left MEPs
Socialist feminists
20th-century Italian women politicians
Presidents of the Province of Genoa